Joshy Mathew  (Malayalam: ജോഷി മാത്യു) an Indian film director in Malayalam cinema, started his career in 1984 as an assistant to renowned director P. Padmarajan. In 1992 he made feature debut with Nakshatra Koodaram (1992). Then followed Oru Kadankatha Pole (1993), Rajadhani (1994), Man of the Match (1996), Pathaam Nilayile Theevandy (Train in the 10th Floor)(2009), Upadesiyude Makan (2010), Black Forest (2013) and In a land far away (2018).

Filmography

 Nakshatra Koodaram (1992)
 Oru Kadankatha Pole (1993)
 Rajadhani (1994)
 Man of the Match (1996)
 Pathaam Nilayile Theevandy (Train in the 10th Floor)(2009)
 Upadesiyude Makan (2010)
 Black Forest (2013)
Angu Doore Oru Desathu - In a Land Far Away (2018)

Awards

International Film Award (FIPRESCI Award at the IFFK 2009-Best Malayalam Film)
 2009: Film - Pathaam Nilayile Theevandy (Train in the 10th Floor)(2009)

National Film Award
 2012: Film - Black Forest (BEST FILM ON ENVIRONMENT CONSERVATION/ PRESERVATION) 

Kerala State Film Award
 2012: Film - Black Forest (Best Children's Film) 
 2018: Film - In a land far away-അങ്ങ് ദൂരെ ഒരു ദേശത്ത്  (Best Children's Film) Kerala film critics award 2018

Kerala Film Critics Award
 2012: Film - Black Forest (Best Environmental Film, Best Children's Film)

References

External links
 Black Forest Movie
 www.inalandfarawaymovie.com

1953 births
Living people
Malayalam film directors
Artists from Kottayam
Film directors from Kerala
21st-century Indian film directors
20th-century Indian film directors